Lawrence Henry Summers (born November 30, 1954) is an American economist who served as the 71st United States secretary of the treasury from 1999 to 2001 and as director of the National Economic Council from 2009 to 2010. He also served as president of Harvard University from 2001 to 2006, where he is the Charles W. Eliot university professor and director of the Mossavar-Rahmani Center for Business and Government at Harvard Kennedy School.  

Born in New Haven, Connecticut, Summers became a professor of economics at Harvard University in 1983. He left Harvard in 1991, working as the Chief Economist of the World Bank from 1991 to 1993. In 1993, Summers was appointed Under Secretary for International Affairs of the United States Department of the Treasury under President Bill Clinton's administration. In 1995, he was promoted to Deputy Secretary of the Treasury under his long-time political mentor Robert Rubin. In 1999, he succeeded Rubin as Secretary of the Treasury.  While working for the Clinton administration, Summers played a leading role in the American response to the 1994 economic crisis in Mexico, the 1997 Asian financial crisis, and the Russian financial crisis. He was also influential in the Harvard Institute for International Development and American-advised privatization of the economies of the post-Soviet states, and in the deregulation of the U.S financial system, including the repeal of the Glass-Steagall Act.

Following the end of Clinton's term, Summers served as the 27th president of Harvard University from 2001 to 2006. Summers resigned as Harvard's president in the wake of a no-confidence vote by Harvard faculty, which resulted in large part from Summers's conflict with Cornel West, financial conflict of interest questions regarding his relationship with Andrei Shleifer, and a 2005 speech in which he offered three reasons for the under-representation of women in science and engineering, including the possibility that there exists a "different availability of aptitude at the high end", in addition to patterns of discrimination and socialization.

After his departure from Harvard, Summers worked as a managing partner at the hedge fund D. E. Shaw & Co., and as a freelance speaker at other financial institutions, including Goldman Sachs, JPMorgan Chase, Citigroup, Merrill Lynch and Lehman Brothers. Summers rejoined public service during the Obama administration, serving as the Director of the White House United States National Economic Council for President Barack Obama from January 2009 until November 2010, where he emerged as a key economic decision-maker in the Obama administration's response to the Great Recession. After his departure from the NEC in December 2010, Summers worked in the private sector and as a columnist in major newspapers. In mid-2013, his name was widely floated as the potential successor to Ben Bernanke as the Chairman of the Federal Reserve, though Obama eventually nominated Federal Reserve Vice-Chairwoman Janet Yellen for the position. As of 2017, Summers retains his Harvard University status as former president emeritus and Charles W. Eliot University Professor. He also regularly writes opinion columns for The Washington Post.

Family and education
Summers was born in New Haven, Connecticut, on November 30, 1954, into a Jewish family, the son of two economists, Robert Summers (who changed the family surname from Samuelson) and Anita Summers (of Romanian-Jewish ancestry), who are both professors at the University of Pennsylvania. He is also the nephew of two Nobel laureates in economics: Paul Samuelson (brother of Robert Summers) and Kenneth Arrow (brother of Anita Arrow Summers).  He spent most of his childhood in Penn Valley, Pennsylvania, a suburb of Philadelphia, where he attended Harriton High School.

At age 16, he entered Massachusetts Institute of Technology (MIT), where he originally intended to study physics but soon switched to economics (S.B., 1975). He was also an active member of the MIT debating team and qualified for participation in the annual National Debate Tournament three times. He attended Harvard University as a graduate student (Ph.D., 1982). In 1983, at age 28, Summers became one of the youngest tenured professors in Harvard's history. It was also during this time that Summers was diagnosed with Hodgkin's lymphoma. He underwent treatment and has since remained cancer-free. He was a visiting academic at the London School of Economics in 1987. Summers has three children (older twin daughters Ruth and Pamela and son Harry) with his first wife, Victoria Joanne (Perry).  In December 2005, Summers married English professor Elisa New, who has three daughters (Yael, Orli and Maya) from a previous marriage. He lives in Brookline, Massachusetts.

Career

Academic economist

As a researcher, Summers has made important contributions in many areas of economics, primarily public finance, labor economics, financial economics, and macroeconomics. Summers has also worked in international economics, economic demography, economic history and development economics. He received the John Bates Clark Medal in 1993 from the American Economic Association. In 1987, he was the first social scientist to win the Alan T. Waterman Award from the National Science Foundation. Summers is also a member of the National Academy of Sciences. Some of his popular courses today, as Charles W. Eliot University Professor at Harvard University, include American Economic Policy and The Political Economy of Globalization.

Public official
Summers was on the staff of the Council of Economic Advisers under President Reagan in 1982–1983. He also served as an economic adviser to the Dukakis Presidential campaign in 1988.

Chief Economist at the World Bank
Summers left Harvard in 1991 and served as Vice President of Development Economics and Chief Economist for the World Bank until 1993.

According to the World Bank's Data & Research office (March, 2017), Summers returned to Washington, D.C. in 1991 as the World Bank's Vice President of Development Economics and Chief Economist. As such, Summers played a "key role" in designing strategies to aid developing countries, worked on the bank's loan committee, guided the bank's research and statistics operations, and guided external training programs.

The World Bank's official site also reports that Summer's research included an "influential" report that demonstrated a very high return from investments in educating girls in developing nations.

According to The Economist, Summers was "often at the centre of heated debates" about economic policy, to an extent exceptional for the history of the World Bank in recent decades.

"Dirty industries" controversy

In December 1991, while at the World Bank, Summers signed a memo that was leaked to the press. Lant Pritchett has claimed authorship of the private memo, which both he and Summers say was intended as sarcasm. The memo stated that "the economic logic behind dumping a load of toxic waste in the lowest wage country is impeccable and we should face up to that. ... I've always thought that under-populated countries in Africa are vastly underpolluted." According to Pritchett, the memo, as leaked, was doctored to remove context and intended irony, and was "a deliberate fraud and forgery to discredit Larry and the World Bank."

Service in the Clinton Administration

In 1993, Summers was appointed Undersecretary for International Affairs and later in the United States Department of the Treasury under the Clinton Administration. In 1995, he was promoted to Deputy Secretary of the Treasury under his long-time political mentor Robert Rubin. In 1999, he succeeded Rubin as Secretary of the Treasury.

Much of Summers's tenure at the Treasury Department was focused on international economic issues. He was deeply involved in the Clinton administration's effort to bail out Mexico and Russia when those nations had currency crises.
Summers set up a project through which the Harvard Institute for International Development provided advice to the Russian government between 1992 and 1997. Later there was a scandal when it emerged that some of the Harvard project members had invested in Russia, and were therefore not impartial advisors.
Summers encouraged then-Russian leader Boris Yeltsin to use the same "three-'ations'" of policy he advocated in the Clinton Administration – "privatization, stabilization, and liberalization."

Summers pressured the Korean government to raise its interest rates and balance its budget in the midst of a recession, policies criticized by Paul Krugman and Joseph Stiglitz. According to the book The Chastening, by Paul Blustein, during this crisis, Summers, along with Paul Wolfowitz, pushed for regime change in Indonesia.

Summers was a leading voice within the Clinton Administration arguing against American leadership in greenhouse gas reductions and against US participation in the Kyoto Protocol, according to internal documents made public in 2009.

As Treasury Secretary, Summers led the Clinton Administration's opposition to tax cuts proposed by the Republican Congress in 1999.

During the California energy crisis of 2000, then-Treasury Secretary Summers teamed with Alan Greenspan and Enron executive Kenneth Lay to lecture California Governor Gray Davis on the causes of the crisis, explaining that the problem was excessive government regulation. Under the advice of Kenneth Lay, Summers urged Davis to relax California's environmental standards in order to reassure the markets.

Summers hailed the Gramm–Leach–Bliley Act in 1999, which lifted more than six decades of restrictions against banks offering commercial banking, insurance, and investment services (by repealing key provisions in the 1933 Glass–Steagall Act): "Today Congress voted to update the rules that have governed financial services since the Great Depression and replace them with a system for the 21st century," Summers said. "This historic legislation will better enable American companies to compete in the new economy." Many critics, including President Barack Obama, have suggested the 2007 subprime mortgage financial crisis was caused by the partial repeal of the 1933 Glass–Steagall Act. Indeed, as a member of President Clinton's Working Group on Financial Markets, Summers, along with U.S. Securities and Exchange Commission (SEC) Chairman Arthur Levitt, Fed Chairman Greenspan, and Secretary Rubin, torpedoed an effort to regulate the derivatives that many blame for bringing the financial market down in Fall 2008.

Views on banking regulation
On May 7, 1998, the Commodity Futures Trading Commission (CFTC) issued a Concept Release soliciting input from regulators, academics,
and practitioners to determine "how best to maintain adequate regulatory safeguards without
impairing the ability of the OTC (over-the-counter) derivatives market to grow and the ability of U.S. entities to remain competitive in the global financial marketplace." On July 30, 1998, then-Deputy Secretary of the Treasury Summers testified before the U.S. Congress that "the parties to these kinds of contract are largely sophisticated financial institutions that would appear to be eminently capable of protecting themselves from fraud and counterparty insolvencies." At the time Summers stated that "to date there has been no clear evidence of a need for additional regulation of the institutional OTC derivatives market, and we would submit that proponents of such regulation must bear the burden of demonstrating that need."
In 1999 Summers endorsed the Gramm–Leach–Bliley Act which removed the separation between investment and commercial banks, saying "With this bill, the American financial system takes a major step forward towards the 21st Century."

When George Stephanopoulos asked Summers about the financial crisis in an ABC interview on March 15, 2009, Summers replied that "there are a lot of terrible things that have happened in the last eighteen months, but what's happened at A.I.G. ... the way it was not regulated, the way no one was watching ... is outrageous."

In February 2009, Summers quoted John Maynard Keynes, saying "When circumstances change, I change my opinion", reflecting both on the failures of Wall Street deregulation and his new leadership role in the government bailout. On April 18, 2010, in an interview on ABC's "This Week" program, Clinton said Summers was wrong in the advice he gave him not to regulate derivatives.

President of Harvard
In 2001, when George W. Bush became President, Summers left the Treasury Department and returned to Harvard as its 27th president, serving from July 2001 until June 2006. He is considered Harvard's first Jewish president, though his predecessor Neil Rudenstine had Jewish ancestry, and received praise from Harvard's Jewish community for his support.

A number of Summers's decisions at Harvard have attracted public controversy, either at the time or since his resignation.

Cornel West affair
In an October 2001 meeting, Summers criticized African American Studies department head Cornel West for allegedly missing three weeks of classes to work on the Bill Bradley presidential campaign, and complained that West was contributing to grade inflation. Summers also claimed that West's "rap" album was an "embarrassment" to the university. West pushed back strongly against the accusations. "The hip-hop scared him. It's a stereotypical reaction", he said later. West, who later called Summers both "uninformed" and "an unprincipled power player" in describing this encounter in his book Democracy Matters (2004), subsequently returned to Princeton University, where he had taught prior to Harvard University.

Differences between the sexes

In January 2005, at a Conference on Diversifying the Science & Engineering Workforce sponsored by the National Bureau of Economic Research, Summers sparked controversy with his discussion of why women may have been underrepresented "in tenured positions in science and engineering at top universities and research institutions".  The conference was designed to be off-the-record so that participants could speak candidly without fear of public misunderstanding or disclosure later.

Summers had prefaced his talk, saying he was adopting an "entirely positive, rather than normative approach" and that his remarks were intended to be an "attempt at provocation."

Summers then began by identifying three hypotheses for the higher proportion of men in high-end science and engineering positions:

 The high-powered job hypothesis
 Different availability of aptitude at the high end
 Different socialization and patterns of discrimination in a search

The second hypothesis, the generally greater variability among men (compared to women) in tests of cognitive abilities, leading to proportionally more males than females at both the lower and upper tails of the test score distributions, caused the most controversy. In his discussion of this hypothesis, Summers said that "even small differences in the standard deviation [between genders] will translate into very large differences in the available pool substantially out [from the mean]". Summers referenced research that implied differences between the standard deviations of males and females in the top 5% of twelfth-graders under various tests. He then went on to argue that, if this research were to be accepted, then "whatever the set of attributes ... that are precisely defined to correlate with being an aeronautical engineer at MIT or being a chemist at Berkeley ... are probably different in their standard deviations as well".

Summers then concluded his discussion of the three hypotheses by saying:

So my best guess, to provoke you, of what's behind all of this is that the largest phenomenon, by far, is the general clash between people's legitimate family desires and employers' current desire for high power and high intensity, that in the special case of science and engineering, there are issues of intrinsic aptitude, and particularly of the variability of aptitude, and that those considerations are reinforced by what are in fact lesser factors involving socialization and continuing discrimination. I would like nothing better than to be proved wrong, because I would like nothing better than for these problems to be addressable simply by everybody understanding what they are, and working very hard to address them.

Summers then went on to discuss approaches to remedying the shortage of women in high-end science and engineering positions.

This lunch-time talk drew accusations of sexism and careless scholarship, and an intense negative response followed, both nationally and at Harvard. Summers apologized repeatedly. Nevertheless, the controversy is speculated to have contributed to his resigning his position as president of Harvard University the following year, as well as costing Summers the job of Treasury Secretary in Obama's administration.

Summers's protégée Sheryl Sandberg has defended him, saying that "Larry has been a true advocate for women throughout his career" at the World Bank and Treasury. Referring to the lunch talk, Sandberg said, "What few seem to note is that it is remarkable that he was giving the speech in the first place – that he cared enough about women's careers and their trajectory in the fields of math and science to proactively analyze the issues and talk about what was going wrong".

In 2016, remarking upon political correctness in institutions of higher education, Summers said:

There is a great deal of absurd political correctness. Now, I'm somebody who believes very strongly in diversity, who resists racism in all of its many incarnations, who thinks that there is a great deal that's unjust in American society that needs to be combated, but it seems to be that there is a kind of creeping totalitarianism in terms of what kind of ideas are acceptable and are debatable on college campuses.

Summers' opposition and support at Harvard
On March 15, 2005, members of the Harvard Faculty of Arts and Sciences, which instructs graduate students in Harvard Graduate School of Arts and Sciences and undergraduates in Harvard College, passed 218–185 a motion of "lack of confidence" in the leadership of Summers, with 18 abstentions. A second motion that offered a milder censure of the president passed 253 to 137, also with 18 abstentions.

The members of the Harvard Corporation, the University's highest governing body, are in charge of the selection of the president and issued statements strongly supporting Summers.

FAS faculty were not unanimous in their comments against Summers. Influential psychologist Steven Pinker defended the legitimacy of Summers's January lecture. When asked if Summers's talk was "within the pale of legitimate academic discourse," Pinker responded "Good grief, shouldn't everything be within the pale of legitimate academic discourse, as long as it is presented with some degree of rigor? That's the difference between a university and a madrassa. There is certainly enough evidence for the hypothesis to be taken seriously."

Summers had stronger support among Harvard College students than among the college faculty. One poll by The Harvard Crimson indicated that students opposed his resignation by a three-to-one margin, with 57% of responding students opposing his resignation and 19% supporting it.

In July 2005, a board member of Harvard Corporation, Conrad K. Harper, resigned saying he was angered both by the university president's comments about women and by Summers being given a salary increase. The resignation letter to the president said, "I could not and cannot support a raise in your salary, ... I believe that Harvard's best interests require your resignation."

Support of economist Andrei Shleifer
Harvard and Andrei Shleifer, a close friend and protégé of Summers, controversially paid $28.5 million to settle a lawsuit by the U.S. government over the conflict of interest Shleifer had while advising Russia's privatization program. The US government had sued Shleifer under the False Claims Act, as he bought Russian stocks while designing the country's privatization. In 2004, a federal judge ruled that while Harvard had violated the contract, Shleifer and his associate alone were liable for treble damages.

In June 2005, Harvard and Shleifer announced that they had reached a tentative settlement with the US government. In August, Harvard, Shleifer, and the Department of Justice reached an agreement under which the university paid $26.5 million to settle the five-year-old lawsuit. Shleifer was also responsible for paying $2 million worth of damages.

Because Harvard paid almost all of the damages and allowed Shleifer to retain his faculty position, the settlement provoked allegations of favoritism by Summers. His continued support for Shleifer strengthened Summers's unpopularity with other professors, as reported in The Harvard Crimson:

In Russia 

In an 18,000-word article "How Harvard Lost Russia" in Institutional Investor by David McClintick (January 2006), the magazine detailed Shleifer's alleged efforts to use his inside knowledge of and sway over the Russian economy in order to make lucrative personal investments, all while leading a Harvard group, advising the Russian government, that was under contract with the U.S. The article suggests that Summers shielded his fellow economist from disciplinary action by the university, and it noted that Summers had forewarned Shleifer and his wife Nancy Zimmerman about the conflict-of-interest regulations back in 1996. Summers's friendship with Shleifer was well known by the corporation when it selected him to succeed Rudenstine and Summers recused himself from all proceedings with Shleifer, whose case was actually handled by an independent committee led by former Harvard president Derek Bok.

Connection to Jeffrey Epstein

An article in The Harvard Crimson in 2003, during Summers's tenure as president, detailed a reportedly "special connection" between Summers and Jeffrey Epstein. Epstein pledged to donate at least $25 million to Harvard during Summers's tenure to endow Harvard's Program for Evolutionary Dynamics, and Epstein was given an office at Harvard for his personal use. Epstein otherwise had no formal connection to Harvard. Summers's ties to Epstein reportedly began "a number of years...before Summers became Harvard’s president and even before he was the Secretary of the Treasury." Flight records introduced as evidence in the 2021 trial of Epstein associate Ghislaine Maxwell show that Summers flew on Jeffrey Epstein's private plane on at least four occasions, including once in 1998 when Summers was United States Deputy Secretary of the Treasury and at least three times while Harvard president. A charity funded by Epstein also donated to the production of a PBS show hosted by Summers's wife and Harvard professor Elisa New.

Winklevoss twins and Facebook
In February 2004, the Winklevoss twins requested a meeting with Summers in order to ask him to intervene on their behalf in an ongoing dispute they had with Facebook founder Mark Zuckerberg. The Winklevosses believed that Zuckerberg had stolen their idea for a social networking website and launched Facebook on his own, after they had asked him to be a part of their project, then called HarvardConnection. Summers believed that the matter was outside the university's jurisdiction, and advised the twins to take their complaint to the courts.

Resignation as Harvard President
On February 21, 2006, Summers announced his intention to step down at the end of the school year effective June 30, 2006. Harvard agreed to provide Summers on his resignation with a one-year paid sabbatical leave, subsidized a $1 million outstanding loan from the university for his personal residence, and provided other payments. Former University President Derek Bok acted as Interim President while the University conducted a search for a replacement which ended with the naming of Drew Gilpin Faust on February 11, 2007.

Post-Harvard presidency career

After a one-year sabbatical, Summers subsequently accepted Harvard University's invitation to serve as the Charles W. Eliot University Professor, one of 20 select University-wide professorships, with offices in the Kennedy School of Government and the Harvard Business School. In 2006 he was also a member of the Panel of Eminent Persons which reviewed the work of the United Nations Conference on Trade and Development. He is a member in the Group of Thirty. He also currently serves on the Berggruen Institute's 21st Century Council, and was part of a 2015 Berggruen-organized meeting with Chinese president Xi Jinping.

Business interests
On October 19, 2006, Summers was hired as a part-time managing director of the New York-based hedge fund D. E. Shaw & Co. for which he received $5 million in salary and other compensation over a 16-month period. At the same time Summers earned $2.7 million in speaking fees from major financial institutions, including Goldman Sachs, JPMorgan Chase, Citigroup, Merrill Lynch and Lehman Brothers. Upon being nominated Treasury Secretary by President Clinton in 1999, Summers listed assets of about $900,000 and debts, including a mortgage, of $500,000. By the time he returned in 2009 to serve in the Obama administration, he reported a net worth between $17 million and $39 million. He is a former member of the Steering Committee of the Bilderberg Group. In 2013, Summers became an early angel investor in India's first car rental company, Zoomcar, which was started by his former Harvard Teaching Fellow.

National Economic Council
Upon the inauguration of Barack Obama as president in January 2009, Summers was appointed to the post of director of the National Economic Council. In this position Summers emerged as a key economic decision-maker in the Obama administration, where he attracted both praise and criticism. There had been friction between Summers and former Federal Reserve Chairman Paul Volcker, as Volcker accused Summers of delaying the effort to organize a panel of outside economic advisers, and Summers had cut Volcker out of White House meetings and had not shown interest in collaborating on policy solutions to the economic crisis. On the other hand, Obama himself was reportedly thrilled with the work Summers did in his first few weeks on the job. And Peter Orszag, another top economic advisor, called Summers "one of the world's most brilliant economists." According to Henry Kissinger Larry Summers should "be given a White House post in which he was charged with shooting down or fixing bad ideas."

In January 2009, as the Obama Administration tried to pass an economic stimulus spending bill, Representative Peter DeFazio (D-OR.) criticized Summers, saying that he thought that President Barack Obama is "ill-advised by Larry Summers. Larry Summers hates infrastructure." DeFazio, along with liberal economists including Paul Krugman and Joseph Stiglitz, had argued that more of the stimulus should be spent on infrastructure, while Summers had supported tax cuts. In late 2008, Summers and economic advisors for then-President-elect Obama presented a memo with options for an economic stimulus package ranging from $550 billion to $900 billion. According to The New Republic, economic advisor Christina Romer initially recommended a $1.8-trillion package, which proposal Summers quickly rejected, believing any stimulus approaching $1 trillion would not pass through Congress. Romer revised her recommendation to $1.2 trillion, which Summers agreed to include in the memo, but Summers struck the figure at the last minute.

According to the Wall Street Journal, Summers called Senator Chris Dodd (D-CT) asking him to remove caps on executive pay at firms that have received stimulus money, including Citigroup.

On April 3, 2009 Summers came under renewed criticism after it was disclosed that he was paid millions of dollars the previous year by companies which he now had influence over as a public servant. He earned $5 million from the hedge fund D. E. Shaw, and collected $2.7 million in speaking fees from Wall Street companies that received government bailout money.

Post-NEC career

Since leaving the NEC in December 2010, Summers has worked as an advisor to hedge fund D. E. Shaw & Co, Citigroup and the NASDAQ OMX Group while resuming his role as a tenured Harvard professor. In June 2011 Summers joined the board of directors of Square, a company developing an electronic payment service, and became a special adviser at venture capital firm Andreessen Horowitz. He joined the board of person-to-person lending company Lending Club in December 2012. In July 2015 Summers joined the Board of Directors of Premise Data, a San Francisco-based data and analytics technology company that sources data from a global network of on-the-ground contributors.

In April 2016, he was one of eight former Treasury secretaries who called on the United Kingdom to remain a member of the European Union ahead of the June 2016 Referendum.

Summers referred to the United Kingdom's "Brexit" vote on June 23, 2016—which concluded in favor of leaving the European Union—as the "worst self-inflicted policy wound that a country has done since the Second World War". However, Summers cautioned that the result was a "wake up call for elites everywhere" and called for "responsible nationalism" in response to simmering public sentiment.

In June 2016, Summers also wrote, "I believe the risks to the US and global economies of Mr Trump’s election as president are far greater [than passage of Brexit]. If he is elected, I would expect a protracted recession to begin within 18 months. The damage would be felt far beyond the United States."

2020 presidential election 
A coalition of progressive groups called on Joe Biden's 2020 presidential campaign to no longer use Summers as an advisor, after reports surfaced that Summers was advising the campaign on economic policy. Progressive groups like the Sunrise Movement and Justice Democrats petitioned the campaign to disavow Summers, saying, "Summers's legacy is advocating for policies that contributed to the skyrocketing inequality and climate crisis we’re living with today." Following the outcry, Summers stated he would not be joining a future Biden administration, in the event that Biden defeated Donald Trump in the 2020 presidential election.

Candidacy for chairmanship of the Federal Reserve and governorship of the Bank of Israel
In 2013, Summers emerged as one of two leading candidates, along with Janet Yellen, to succeed Ben Bernanke as chair of the Federal Reserve. The possibility of his nomination created a great deal of controversy with some senators of both parties declaring opposition. On September 15, Summers withdrew his name from consideration for the position, writing: "I have reluctantly concluded that any possible confirmation process for me would be acrimonious and would not serve the interest of the Federal Reserve, the Administration or, ultimately, the interests of the nation's ongoing economic recovery."

During the 2013, Summers had been reported as preferred candidate by the Cabinet of Israel and Prime Minister Benjamin Netanyahu to succeed Stanley Fischer as governor of the Bank of Israel. Netanyahu personally asked him to take the post, an offer he turned down.

Criticism of the Biden Administration
Summers emerged as an early opponent of the macroeconomic policy employed by President Joe Biden, charging the $1.9 trillion American Rescue Plan Act of 2021 as "the least responsible macroeconomic policy we’ve had in the last 40 years." The macroeconomic framework, Summers holds, risks an economic recession and market destabilization.

In popular culture
The 2010 film The Social Network, which deals with the founding of the social networking site Facebook, shows Summers (played by Douglas Urbanski), in his then-capacity as President of Harvard, meeting with Cameron and Tyler Winklevoss to discuss their accusations against Mark Zuckerberg.

In the 2010 documentary Inside Job, Summers is presented as one of the key figures behind the financial crisis of 2007–2008. Charles Ferguson points out the economist's role in what he characterizes as the deregulation of many domains of the financial sector.

In The Simpsons episode "E My Sports" (S30 E17), first broadcast March 17, 2019, the character Principal Seymour Skinner looks at a $100 bill and remarks "$100 bill, autographed by Lawrence Summers. Such a carefree signature, before the great recession."

See also
Economic policy of the Barack Obama administration

References

External links

 Faculty page at the John F. Kennedy School of Government at Harvard University
 Profile at the U.S. Treasury Department
 Lawrence Summers at Big Think
 
 
 
 
 
 Voices on Antisemitism Interview with Lawrence Summers from the US Holocaust Museum, February 15, 2007
 Robert Scheer on Resignation of Lawrence Summers – video report by Democracy Now!, September 22, 2010
 Summers' policy proposals to ameliorate the "devastating consequences" of the capacity of capital employing robots, 3-D printing, artificial intelligence, and similar technologies "to replace white-collar as well as blue-collar work," Democracy: A Journal of Ideas, Issue #32, Spring 2014
 Membership at the Council on Foreign Relations

|-

|-

|-

|-

|-

|-

1954 births
Living people
20th-century American economists
20th-century American politicians
21st-century American economists
21st-century American politicians
American columnists
American officials of the United Nations
Center for Global Development
Citigroup people
Clinton administration cabinet members
Jeffrey Epstein 
Fellows of the American Academy of Arts and Sciences
Fellows of the Econometric Society
Goldman Sachs people
Group of Thirty
Harriton High School alumni
Harvard Kennedy School faculty
Harvard University alumni
Jewish American economists
Jewish American members of the Cabinet of the United States
JPMorgan Chase people
Lehman Brothers people 
Members of the Steering Committee of the Bilderberg Group
Members of the United States National Academy of Sciences
Merrill (company) people
MIT School of Humanities, Arts, and Social Sciences alumni
Politicians from Brookline, Massachusetts
Politicians from New Haven, Connecticut
Presidents of Harvard University
Scientists from New Haven, Connecticut
The Washington Post columnists
United States Secretaries of the Treasury
World Bank Chief Economists
New Keynesian economists